Up the MacGregors! (a Technicolor film in Techniscope also known as 7 Women for the MacGregors) is a 1967 Italian spaghetti Western directed by Franco Giraldi (here credited as Frank Garfield). It is the immediate sequel of Seven Guns for the MacGregors, still directed by Giraldi. The film has the same cast as its predecessor except for Manuel Zarzo and Robert Woods, who refused the role due to his conflicts with the leading actress Agata Flori, the wife of producer Dario Sabatello.

Plot summary
The elder MacGregors wakes up in the middle of the night to take out a chest of gold ingots and coins from the hiding place and bury it outside their house while being secretly watched by a bandit spy.

On the day of the engagement party between Gregor MacGregor and Rosita Carson the bandit Maldonado, with his gang, came and robbed the MacGregors of their gold which the elder MacGregors buried. They left a note, purporting to be from Frank James, in the hole where the chest of gold was buried. So, the MacGregor brothers throw themselves in pursuit of Frank James. When they found Frank who is now a run down old man, they are told that he was framed by Maldonado.  So, they set out again but this time to find Maldonado.

Upon finding out that Gregor has gone with the traveling medicine man and his daughter, Dolly, to Maldonado's hide out, Rosita out of jealousy ride out to confront Dolly; ending up being kept as a prisoner of the outlaws together with Gregor who came back to rescue her after he and his brothers managed to regain the stolen gold. The other MacGregor brothers also came back to Maldonado's hide out to rescue Gregor and Rosita. They escaped but are later trapped in an empty cargo train wagon. Soon they are rescued by their parents, the Donovans, a band of Apaches, and other cowboys. During a fight with Gregor Maldonado fell off the engine when the engine crashed into a stationary train cargo wagon and is killed by the run away engine.

Cast 
 David Bailey as Gregor MacGregor
 Agata Flori as Rosita Carson (credited as Agatha Flory)
 Nazzareno Zamperla as Peter MacGregor (credited as Nick Anderson)
 Roberto Camardiel as Pa Donovan
 Paolo Magalotti as Kenneth MacGregor (credited as Peter Carter)
 Ana Casares as Dolly
 Víctor Israel as Trevor
 Leo Anchóriz as Maldonado
 George Rigaud as Alistair MacGregor
 Alberto Dell'Acqua as Dick MacGregor (credited as Cole Kitosch)
 Hugo Blanco as David MacGregor
 Jeff Cameron as Bandit (credited as Nino Scarciofolo)
 Francesco Tensi as Harold MacGregor (credited as Harry Cotton)
 Saturno Cerra as Johnny MacGregor
 Julio Perez Tabernero as Mark MacGregor
 Ana Maria Noe as Mamie MacGregor (credited as Anne Marie Noe)
 Margherita Horowitz as Annie MacGregor (credited as Margaret Horowitz)

Release
Up the MacGregors! was released in Rome in 1967 and in Spain in July 1967.

Reception
In a contemporary review, "Byro." of Variety found the film to be "an acceptably  entertaining affair" while noting the film was bloodless and non-violent but had good action scenes directed by Franco Giraldi.

References

Footnotes

Sources

External links
 
 
 
 

1967 films
Spaghetti Western films
Italian sequel films
Films directed by Franco Giraldi
1967 Western (genre) films
Films scored by Ennio Morricone
Columbia Pictures films
1960s Italian films